The Moncton Magic are a Canadian professional basketball team based in Moncton, New Brunswick, that joined the National Basketball League of Canada for the 2017–18 season, replacing the league-operated Moncton Miracles in the summer of 2017. The Magic were one of two NBL teams in New Brunswick, the other being the Saint John Riptide (formerly Saint John Mill Rats). The Magic left the NBL in August 2021 and have been inactive since.

History 
In 2011, the Moncton Miracles were founded and made their debut in the 2011–12 season of the National Basketball League of Canada. After three seasons of operations under the league management and without an owner, the NBL Canada sold a new franchise to three local business to play as the Moncton Magic in 2017. They hired Joe Salerno from the Island Storm as the franchise's first head coach. In October 2020, Moncton Magic hired a new coach, Nelson Terroba, from the Texas Legends in the NBA G League.

The league did not play a 2020–21 season due to the COVID-19 pandemic, and subsequently withdrew from the league in August 2021.

Season-by-season record

Current roster

Notable players
- Set a club record or won an individual award as a professional player.
- Played at least one official international match for his senior national team at any time.
  Jason Calliste
  Jeremiah Mordi

References

External links
 

 
Sport in Moncton
Basketball teams in New Brunswick
Basketball teams established in 2017
2017 establishments in New Brunswick